The 2017 Catalan regional election was held on Thursday 21 December 2017 to elect the 12th Parliament of the autonomous community of Catalonia. All 135 seats in the Parliament were up for election. The election was called by Spanish prime minister Mariano Rajoy after the invocation of Article 155 of the 1978 Spanish Constitution to enforce direct rule in Catalonia and the subsequent dismissal of the Catalan government under President Carles Puigdemont. The three pro-Catalan independence parties won a slim majority of parliamentary seats, claiming 70 out of 135, but fell short of a majority in the popular vote by securing 47.6% of the share.

Pro-Catalan independence parties maintained their parliamentary majority at the 2015 election, although then-President Artur Mas and his Junts pel Sí (JxSí) coalition—made up primarily by Democratic Convergence of Catalonia (CDC) and Republican Left of Catalonia (ERC)—required support from the Popular Unity Candidacy (CUP) to govern. The CUP's decision to vote against Mas led to his withdrawal and to the election of Carles Puigdemont, until then mayor of Girona, as leader of a CDC–ERC coalition government. Shortly thereafter, CDC was re-founded as the Catalan European Democratic Party (PDeCAT).

On 27 October 2017, following the controversial referendum on 1 October, the pro-independence majority in the Catalan parliament voted in favour of a unilateral declaration of independence, just hours before the Spanish Senate voted to invoke Article 155 of the Spanish Constitution. This allowed Prime Minister Mariano Rajoy to dismiss the Catalan government and dissolve the Catalan parliament, calling a regional election for 21 December. With 36 seats, the main anti-independence party, Citizens (Cs), emerged as the largest in the Parliament. The Socialists' Party of Catalonia (PSC) performed well below expectations and increased its seat count by one, whereas Catalunya en Comú–Podem, a left-wing party in favor of self-governance for the region but not siding itself with either bloc, received 7.5% of the vote and 8 seats. Owing to the combined performance of Puigdemont's Together for Catalonia (JuntsxCat) and ERC, parties in support of independence maintained their majority in the election, meaning that it was mathematically possible for a pro-independence coalition government to return to power, despite their overall majority having been reduced by two seats.

The biggest election loser was Rajoy's People's Party (PP), whose electoral collapse—reduced to 4.2% of the share and 4 out of 135 seats—meant it would be unable to form a parliamentary group of its own in the Catalan parliament for the first time in history. The scale of PP's downfall, coupled with the success of Cs, threatened to have a political impact beyond Catalonia, with PP leaders fearing it could spell the end of the party's hegemony over the centre-right vote in Spain.

Overview

Electoral system
The Parliament of Catalonia was the devolved, unicameral legislature of the autonomous community of Catalonia, having legislative power in regional matters as defined by the Spanish Constitution and the Catalan Statute of Autonomy, as well as the ability to vote confidence in or withdraw it from a regional president.

As a result of no regional electoral law having been approved since the re-establishment of Catalan autonomy, the electoral procedure came regulated under Transitory Provision Fourth of the 1979 Statute, supplemented by the provisions within the Organic Law of General Electoral Regime. Voting for the Parliament was on the basis of universal suffrage, which comprised all nationals over 18 years of age, registered in Catalonia and in full enjoyment of their political rights. Additionally, Catalans abroad were required to apply for voting before being permitted to vote, a system known as "begged" or expat vote. The 135 members of the Parliament of Catalonia were elected using the D'Hondt method and a closed list proportional representation, with an electoral threshold of three percent of valid votes—which included blank ballots—being applied in each constituency. Seats were allocated to constituencies, corresponding to the provinces of Barcelona, Girona, Lleida and Tarragona, with each being allocated a fixed number of seats.

The use of the D'Hondt method might result in a higher effective threshold, depending on the district magnitude.

Election date
The term of the Parliament of Catalonia expired four years after the date of its previous election, unless it was dissolved earlier. The regional president was required to call an election fifteen days prior to the date of expiry of parliament, with election day taking place within from forty to sixty days after the call. The previous election was held on 27 September 2015, which meant that the legislature's term would have expired on 27 September 2019. The election was required to be called no later than 12 September 2019, with it taking place up to the sixtieth day from the call, setting the latest possible election date for the Parliament on Monday, 11 November 2019.

The president had the prerogative to dissolve the Parliament of Catalonia and call a snap election, provided that no motion of no confidence was in process and that dissolution did not occur before one year had elapsed since a previous one under this procedure. In the event of an investiture process failing to elect a regional president within a two-month period from the first ballot, the Parliament was to be automatically dissolved and a fresh election called.

Background

Government formation

The 2015 election resulted in pro-Catalan independence Junts pel Sí (JxSí) (a coalition comprising the two main centre-right and centre-left Catalan parties at the time, Democratic Convergence of Catalonia (CDC) and Republican Left of Catalonia (ERC), together with several minor parties) and Popular Unity Candidacy (CUP) holding a slim majority of seats, despite not securing a majority of votes as was their objective. President Artur Mas' JxSí coalition also fell short of its goal to secure an absolute majority on its own, obtaining 62 seats against the combined 63 of the remaining opposition parties. Thus, Mas found himself depending on CUP's support for securing his nomination to be re-elected to the office. The CUP had difficulty in supporting Mas, whom they viewed as personally tainted by several corruption scandals involving his CDC party. In the end, a last-minute deal was struck between JxSí and the CUP to ensure a pro-independence government under CDC's Carles Puigdemont, narrowly avoiding a new election being called and leading Mas to retire from frontline politics.

2017 events

On 26 October 2017, several weeks after a major crisis had unveiled in Catalonia over the attempted celebration of an unconstitutional independence referendum, it was expected that President Puigdemont would call a snap regional election to prevent the Spanish government from enforcing direct rule in the region, a procedure involving the triggering of Article 155 of the Spanish Constitution which was already underway in the Spanish Senate, pending approval on the following day. This move sparked outcry within pro-independence ranks, including members within Puigdemont's coalition, who had aimed for a unilateral declaration of independence in response to the triggering of Article 155. Finally, Puigdemont ruled out calling an election, allegedly because of the Spanish government's refusal to call off the invocation of the Article 155 procedure even were an election to be called by Catalan authorities. After Puigdemont's refusal to call an election, a debate over a possible declaration of independence went ahead as planned in the Parliament of Catalonia, simultaneous to the Senate debating the enforcement of direct rule. At the end of the debate, the Catalan parliament voted a unilateral declaration of independence which was backed 70–10, two MPs casting a blank ballot and all MPs from Citizens (Cs), the Socialists' Party of Catalonia (PSC) and the People's Party (PP) boycotting the vote. Once Article 155 was approved, Mariano Rajoy dismissed the entire Catalan government from office and declared the Parliament's dissolution, calling a regional election for 21 December 2017.

Puigdemont and part of his removed cabinet fled to Belgium on 30 October in a move to avoid action from the Spanish judiciary, as the Spanish Attorney General José Manuel Maza announced a criminal complaint against them for rebellion, sedition and embezzlement. On 2 November, the Spanish National Court ordered that eight members of the deposed Catalan government—including former Vice President and ERC leader Oriol Junqueras—be remanded in custody without bail after being summoned to appear to respond to the criminal charges pressed against them, with a ninth—Santi Vila—being granted a €50,000 bail. European Arrest Warrants were issued for Puigdemont and his four other cabinet members in Belgium refusing to attend the hearing.

Parliamentary composition
The Parliament of Catalonia was officially dissolved on 28 October 2017, after the publication of the dissolution decree in the Official State Gazette. The table below shows the composition of the parliamentary groups in the chamber at the time of dissolution.

Parties and candidates
The electoral law allowed for parties and federations registered in the interior ministry, coalitions and groupings of electors to present lists of candidates. Parties and federations intending to form a coalition ahead of an election were required to inform the relevant Electoral Commission within ten days of the election call, whereas groupings of electors needed to secure the signature of at least one percent of the electorate in the constituencies for which they sought election, disallowing electors from signing for more than one list of candidates.

Below is a list of the main parties and electoral alliances which contested the election:

After independence was declared by the Parliament of Catalonia on 27 October and Prime Minister Mariano Rajoy announced the Parliament's dissolution and a regional election for 21 December, pro-independence parties debated whether they should contest the election–thus abiding by Spanish law, and acknowledging independence did not take place–or boycott it and thus risk remaining absent from the Parliament in the next legislature.

On 5 November 2017, the Catalan European Democratic Party (PDeCAT) proposed as their election candidate Carles Puigdemont, who in the previous days had already showed interest in leading the PDeCAT into the 21 December election from Belgium. PDeCAT members sought to contest the election into a unitary list formed by pro-independence parties for the right of self-determination and against the use of Article 155, calling for "amnesty of political prisoners".
On 13 November, the PDeCAT announced that it would run under the Together for Catalonia umbrella, centered around Puigdemont and including non-party members such as Jordi Sànchez.

Republican Left of Catalonia (ERC) rejected the idea of renewing the Junts pel Sí alliance, and made its participation in any prospective electoral coalition conditional on it including the Popular Unity Candidacy (CUP) and members from Catalunya Sí que es Pot–in reference to the Podemos branch in Catalonia (Podem), led by Albano Dante Fachin, who had increasingly distanced himself from the party's national leadership. The CUP dubbed the election "illegitimate" and rejected contesting the election under their own brand, but did not rule out running under a different label or supporting a unitary pro-independence alliance. After the CUP ruled out a coalition with other parties on 7 November, ERC rejected a joint candidacy of pro-independence parties and announced it would contest the election on its own.

Catalunya en Comú, Ada Colau's party successor to the En Comú Podem electoral alliance which contested the 2015 and 2016 general elections in Catalonia, chose Xavier Domènech as its electoral candidate. Domènech proposed an alliance with Podem, which under Fachin had rejected merging into Colau's party earlier in 2017. Podem's grassroots members voted in favour of an alliance with Catalunya en Comú, after Fachin had resigned as regional party leader over disputes with the national leadership. Both parties announced they would contest the election under the Catalunya en Comú–Podem label.

On 7 November, the Socialists' Party of Catalonia (PSC) announced an agreement with Units per Avançar, the wing of the defunct party Democratic Union of Catalonia that rejected separatism in 2015, thereby aiming to integrate some of its members in its list and hopefully to add the almost 102,000 votes collected by that party at the previous election, which were not enough to gain representation by themselves. The agreement was refused the status of a proper coalition; hence, PSC ran under its own name only.

Campaign

Party slogans

Budget

Election debates

Opinion polls
The tables below list opinion polling results in reverse chronological order, showing the most recent first and using the dates when the survey fieldwork was done, as opposed to the date of publication. Where the fieldwork dates are unknown, the date of publication is given instead. The highest percentage figure in each polling survey is displayed with its background shaded in the leading party's colour. If a tie ensues, this is applied to the figures with the highest percentages. The "Lead" column on the right shows the percentage-point difference between the parties with the highest percentages in a poll.

Graphical summary

Voting intention estimates
The table below lists weighted voting intention estimates. Refusals are generally excluded from the party vote percentages, while question wording and the treatment of "don't know" responses and those not intending to vote may vary between polling organisations. When available, seat projections determined by the polling organisations are displayed below (or in place of) the percentages in a smaller font; 68 seats were required for an absolute majority in the Parliament of Catalonia.

Results

Overall

Distribution by constituency

Elected members

Aftermath

Initial reactions
The results were announced after polls in the region closed, with Citizens (Cs) becoming the largest party in the regional parliament, but pro-independence parties maintained a majority of seats. Cs gained twelve seats in the election under the leadership of Inés Arrimadas, bringing its total to 36. This meant that the largest party in the region was overtly and directly opposed to independence. This increase in the vote share left it 31 seats short of a majority in the parliament.
 
Together for Catalonia (JuntsxCat), the party of former president Carles Puigdemont, also saw an increase in its seat total, emerging as the second-largest party in the region with 34 seats. This represented an increase of three seats for the party, which stood on a staunchly pro-independence platform, as dictated by its exiled leader. While the party lost its position as the largest in parliament, the improved performance of the Republican Left of Catalonia (ERC), a left-wing party also campaigning for independence from Spain, helped ensure that JuntsxCat would maintain its dominant role in regional politics. ERC, under the stewardship of Oriol Junqueras, who served as vice president under Puigdemont, secured 32 seats, leaving the pro-independence parties a mere two seats short of re-establishing a coalition and holding their majority. These seats were provided by the Popular Unity Candidacy (CUP), which, in spite of a severely diminished performance from the previous election, still held four seats, courtesy of a strong performance in Barcelona. This ensured that pro-independence parties were able to maintain their majority in the parliament. Five independent politicians, who were participants in the Junts pel Sí bloc but not party members, lost their seats. Consequently, despite both JuntsxCat and ERC increasing their number of seats, the majority in the parliament for independence was diminished by two seats, but nonetheless maintained. The result was hailed by Puigdemont as a "slap in the face" for Madrid and for Mariano Rajoy.

Government formation

As a result of pro-independence parties securing a parliamentary majority, Arrimadas announced she would not try to form a government on her own, instead waiting and see how negotiations between pro-independence parties evolved. As the candidate of the most-voted party within the pro-independence bloc, Puigdemont intended to be re-elected as president, but this was hampered by the fact he risked being arrested by Spanish authorities upon returning from his self-imposed exile in Brussels, as Spain's authorities considered him a fugitive. Further, pro-independence parties could only command 62 seats—six short of a majority—as in practice eight of their elected deputies were either in Brussels with Puigdemont or in preventive detention.

One of these was ERC's leader Oriol Junqueras, who aimed at becoming president himself on the grounds that he could be granted prison permits that allowed him to attend parliamentary plenary sessions, whereas Puigdemont would have it near-impossible to be invested from Brussels—Parliament's regulations required for any candidate to the office to be physically present in the investiture—or to rule Catalonia from abroad. Members of JuntsxCat insisted that they would only vote for Puigdemont as president, even if that meant forcing a new election, and claimed that they intended to pressure Mariano Rajoy into allowing Puigdemont's return.

After the Catalan parliament elected Roger Torrent as new speaker, Puigdemont was proposed as candidate for re-election as Catalan premier. Facing arrest on possible charges of rebellion, sedition and misuse of public funds, the Catalan parliament delayed Puigdemont's investiture after Constitutional Court ruled that he could not assume the presidency from abroad. With other pro-independence leaders assuring the pro-independence movement should outlive Puigdemont in order to end the political deadlock, the former Catalan president announced on 1 March he would step his claim aside in order to allow detained activist Jordi Sànchez, from his Together for Catalonia alliance, to become president instead. As Spain's Supreme Court did not allow Sànchez to be freed from jail to attend his investiture ceremony, Sànchez ended up giving up his candidacy on 21 March in favour of former Catalan government spokesman Jordi Turull, who was also under investigation for his role in the referendum.

Turull was defeated in the first ballot of a hastily convened investiture session held on 22 March, with only his Together for Catalonia alliance and ERC voting for him and the Popular Unity Candidacy abstaining, resulting in a 64–65 defeat. The next day and less than 24 hours before he was due to attend the second ballot, the Supreme Court announced that thirteen senior Catalan leaders—including Turull—would be charged with rebellion over their roles in the 2017 unilateral referendum and subsequent declaration of independence. In anticipation of this ruling and in order to avoid appearing in court, Marta Rovira—ERC's general secretary and deputy leader to jailed Oriol Junqueras—fled the country to Switzerland in "self-exile". This prompted the Court to rule that Turull and several others would be remanded in custody without bail. As a result, the Parliament speaker Roger Torrent cancelled Turull's second investiture ballot. Turull's first ballot nonetheless started the clock towards automatic parliamentary dissolution, meaning a new regional election would be called for 15 July if no candidate was elected as Catalan president before 22 May.

On 12 May, Quim Torra didn't earn the absolute majority support to be invested president, with 66 votes against 65 in the first round (the absolute majority was 68 votes, from 135 total votes). On 14 May, Torra was elected as new Catalan premier in the second round of vote, with the same results, when only a simple majority was necessary.

Notes

References
Opinion poll sources

Other

2017 in Catalonia
Catalonia
December 2017 events in Spain
Regional elections in Catalonia